Little Duck Creek is a  long 2nd order tributary to South Hyco Creek in Person County, North Carolina.  Little Duck Creek joins South Hyco Creek within Hyco Lake.

Variant names
According to the Geographic Names Information System, it has also been known historically as:
Duck Creek

Course
Little Duck Creek rises about 0.5 miles south-southwest of Olive Hill, North Carolina and then flows northwest to join South Hyco Creek about 1.5 miles southeast of Concord.

Watershed
Little Duck Creek drains  of area, receives about 46.4 in/year of precipitation, has a wetness index of 398.38, and is about 44% forested.

References

Rivers of North Carolina
Rivers of Person County, North Carolina
Tributaries of the Roanoke River